This is a List of rivers of Asia.  It includes major, notable rivers in Asia.

Alphabetical order
Amu Darya - Afghanistan, Turkmenistan, Uzbekistan - Aral Sea
Amur - Northeastern China, Russia (Siberia) - Sea of Okhotsk
Angara 
Argun River (Asia)
Aras -Iran
Badulu Oya - Sri Lanka
Bentara River - Sri Lanka
Bhima River (maharastra)-India
Buriganga River - Bangladesh
Büyük Menderes River
Chao Phraya - Thailand - Gulf of Thailand
Chenab River - Pakistan and India
Deduru Oya River - Sri Lanka
Devi River - India
Euphrates (Fırat) - Turkey, Syria, Iraq
Gal Oya River - Sri Lanka
Ganges River - India and Bangladesh
Ghaggar River
Gin River - Sri Lanka
Ga'aton River- Israel
Godavari - India
Hai - China - Yellow Sea
Han River - Korea - Yellow Sea
Hari River, Afghanistan - Afghanistan and Turkmenistan
Helmand River - Afghanistan and Iran
Hatton Oya - Sri Lanka
Hongshui River - China
Huai - China - Yellow Sea
Huang He (Yellow River) - China
Huangpu River - China
Hulan River - China
Hululu Ganga - Sri Lanka
Indus - China (Tibet) and Pakistan
Irrawaddy - Burma
Irtysh - China
Jamuna -Bangladesh
Jhelum River - Pakistan
Jordan - Israel, Jordan
Kabul River - Pakistan and Afghanistan
Kala Oya River - Sri Lanka
Kalu River - Sri Lanka
Paras River - Russia
Kampar River - Indonesia
Kanakarayan Aru - Sri Lanka
Kapuas - Borneo
Karakash - China (Takla Makan)
Karatash River - Xinjiang Uyghur Autonomous Region of China
Karnaphuli - India, Bangladesh
Karun - Iran
Kaveri River - India
Kelani River - Sri Lanka
Khabur Turkey, Syria
Kishon River - Israel
Kızılırmak River, Halys - Turkey
Krishna - India - Bay of Bengal
Kolyma - Russia (Siberia)
Kotmale Oya - Sri Lanka
Küçük Menderes (Cayster) - Turkey
Lena - Russia (Siberia)
Lijiang
Lishui (Li)- China
Liao - Northeast China - Bohai Gulf
Litani River - Lebanon 
Loboc River - Bohol, Philippines
Luni River - Rajasthan, India 
Maduru Oya River - Sri Lanka
Mae Sai River -Myanmar (Tachileik) -Thailand (Mae Sai)
Maha Oya River - Sri Lanka
Malwathu Oya River - Sri Lanka
Marikina River - Philippines (Marikina, Metro Manila)
Meghna-Bangladesh
Mekong - China, Laos, Myanmar, Thailand, Vietnam, Cambodia.
Menik River - Sri Lanka
Mindanao - Philippines
Mahaweli River - Sri Lanka
Mahanadhi River (Orissa)- India
Naf River- Myanmar, Bangladesh
Nagavalli River-India
Nakdong River - South Korea - Korea Strait
Nan River - Thailand
Narmada River - India (Gujarat)
Nilwala River - Sri Lanka
Nizhnyaya Tunguska River (Lower Tunguska) - Russia
Ob - Russia (Siberia) - Gulf of Ob of the Arctic Ocean
Om - Russia
Orontes ('Asi) - Lebanon, Syria, Turkey
Pasig River - Philippines (Pasig and Manila, Metro Manila)
Pearl River - China - South China Sea
Penna River-India
Periyar River-India-Kerala
Rajang River - Malaysia - South China Sea
Ravi River - Pakistan and India
Red River -  China, Vietnam - South China Sea
Rio Grande de Mindanao - Philippines
Sabarmati River -India
Sakarya River - Turkey
Salween - China (Tibet, Yunnan), Myanmar, Thailand - Andaman Sea
Sefid River Iran
Selenge River - Mongolia, Russia (Siberia)
Shatt al-Arab - Iraq, Iran - Persian Gulf
Singapore River-Singapore, Singapore-Marina Reservoir
Songhua - Northeast China, Russia (Siberia)
Sutlej river - Pakistan and India
Syr Darya - Kazakhstan
Tapti River (Maharashtra)-India
Tigris - Turkey, Syria, Iraq
Tumen River - China, North Korea, Russia - Sea of Japan
Tuo river - China
Thungabhadra River - India
Thamarabarani River-India
Ural River - Russia - Kazakhstan
Vaigai River - India
Wa River - Thailand
Walawe River - Sri Lanka
Xi - China
Xiang - China
Yamuna River-India
Yangtze (Chang Jiang) - China - East China Sea
Yalu - North Korea, China - Korea Bay of the Yellow Sea
Yarkon River- Israel
Yellow River (Huang He) - China - Yellow Sea
Yenisei - Russia (Siberia)
Yeşilırmak -Turkey
Yuan- China
Yurungkash - China (Takla Makan)
Zayanderud - Iran
Zeravshan - Tajikistan, Uzbekistan
Zijiang (Zi)- China

See also
 Lists of rivers
 List of rivers of Africa
 List of rivers of the Americas
 List of the longest Asian rivers
 List of rivers of Europe
 List of rivers of Oceania
 Major rivers of India

External links 
 

Asia, list of rivers of

River